Mantegna is a surname. Notable people with the name include:

 Andrea Mantegna ( – 1506), Italian painter
 Gia Mantegna (born 1990), American actress
 Joe Mantegna (born 1947), American actor

See also
 Mantegna Tarocchi, two sets of 15th-century Italian cards with engravings